Antonio de Celano (died 1455) was a Roman Catholic prelate who served as Bishop of Lettere-Gragnano (1440–1455).

Biography
On 26 September 1440, Antonio de Celano was appointed during the papacy of Pope Eugene IV as Bishop of Lettere-Gragnano.
He served as Bishop of Lettere-Gragnano until his death in 1455.

References

External links and additional sources
 (for Chronology of Bishops) 
 (for Chronology of Bishops)  

15th-century Italian Roman Catholic bishops
Bishops appointed by Pope Eugene IV
1455 deaths